Pyongyang Tram is a public tram system in Pyongyang, the capital of the North Korea. The first line of the current system opened in 1989. There are currently four lines in operation.

Overview
Before the Korean War from 1950 to 1953, there were three tramway systems in the entire Korean Peninsula: one each in Seoul, Busan and Pyongyang. However, the system in Pyongyang was discontinued after the war, largely due to the significant destruction of the city by US/UN bombing attacks. The remaining two in Seoul and Busan survived the war but were eventually discontinued too when motorcars became more common and a larger means of transport in South Korea in 1968, thus leaving no tramway networks on the peninsula.

During the North Korean famine, the service of tram lines became sparse, and often trams would not run due to the lack of drivers and shortage of electricity.

Unlike South Korea, personal ownership of automobiles in North Korea is very rare. North Koreans, especially those living in Pyongyang and other major cities, rely mainly on public transport. In Pyongyang, there are trolleybuses (the Pyongyang trolleybus system) and subways (the Pyongyang Metro), with these two serving as its main forms of public transport. However, as trolleybus lines became gradually overcrowded, the city decided to re-open tram-lines. The first line was opened on 15 April 1991.

A number of Tatra T4 trams and its trailer B4 were bought from Dresden, Magdeburg and Leipzig in 1997–1998.

From 14 October 2002, the section of Line 1 between P'yŏngyang-yŏk and Songyo was closed, as the bridge over Taedong River started to deteriorate, splitting Line 1 into two parts divided by the Taedong River. The section from Songyo to Songsin was eventually replaced by a trolleybus in 2014. The part crossing the bridge was replaced by a bus service. Demolition of the tracks between Songyo and Pyongyang Station was completed by 9 September 2003.

In 2008, the City Transportation Company of Prague sold 20 used T3s to Pyongyang Public Transportation Enterprise together with a shipment of tram-rails. These trams were built ranging from 1967 for the Tatra T3 in original modification, to 1987 for the T3SUCS modification. According to Ondřej Pečený, a spokesman for the City Transportation Company of Prague, these trams are in very good condition, and can run for at least two years without the need of a service. 
The tram cars were made by Tatra, a Czechoslovak company, during that nation's socialist era. Various types are used, but there are currently no low-floor tram cars.

After the closure of Songsin depot, an extension was added to Rangnang depot to house the trams transferred from that depot.

Foreign tourists were previously not permitted to ride the tram lines, but some recent tours have started to include tramway rides (though rides are not shared with locals and are instead chartered, unlike the Pyongyang Metro).

Due to the need for transport, tram drivers cannot afford to relax, even on holidays.

Lines
There are currently three lines in operation plus a meter gauge line operated by the military.

As of 2006, the fare is ₩5 for any section. There are also coupon tickets (sinae ch'ap'yo) issued in the form of tickets inserted into the fare box.

Rolling stock
For the full list, see Trams and trolleybuses in North Korea

Prior to 2018, the rolling stock used were the Czechoslovakian ČKD Praha Tatra T6B5K, Tatra T3/SUCS, Tatra T4D and B4D and KT8D5K in either red/white livery or blue/white. The Kŭmsusan line uses VBZ Be 4/4 Type Ib rolling stock on a different gauge of 1,000 mm, rather than 1,435 mm for lines 1–3. The Shenyang ST4 had been retired in 1999 due to their failing articulation joint and subsequently converted into Chollima-961/971 trolleybuses while it is possible others were sent to the Chongjin tram system where they received a new body at the Chongjin Bus Factory.

According to a Czech reporter, 42 out of the original 45 KT8D5 trams still run. Despite sanctions limiting the supply of spare parts, trams operate with below average maintenance, though the more recent development of locally built electrical equipment and continued maintenance without a foreign supply of spare parts have raised suspicions in Czech media.

In August 2018, following the introduction of new trolleybuses and metro cars, new partially domestically-produced tram cars were introduced in Pyongyang for the first time in about twenty years. The bodies were manufactured by Pyongyang Bus Repair Factory and named Thongil-181, on the chassis of the Tatra KT8D5K.

See also
Pyongyang Metro
Trams and trolleybuses in North Korea
Transport in North Korea
List of tram and light rail transit systems
Trolleybuses in Pyongyang

References

Further reading
Hayato Kokubu, Shōgun-sama no Tetsudō: Kitachōsen Tetsudō Jijō ("Railway of the Dear Leader: The Railway Situation in North Korea"), 2007.

External links

Pyongyang Tram 360 degree Virtual Tour
Map and aerial photos

Transport in Pyongyang
Tram transport in North Korea
Metre gauge railways in North Korea
Pyongyang